The following lists events that happened during 2002 in South Africa.

Incumbents
 President: Thabo Mbeki.
 Deputy President: Jacob Zuma.
 Chief Justice: Arthur Chaskalson.

Cabinet 
The Cabinet, together with the President and the Deputy President, forms part of the Executive.

National Assembly

Provincial Premiers 
 Eastern Cape Province: Makhenkesi Stofile 
 Free State Province: Winkie Direko
 Gauteng Province: Mbhazima Shilowa 
 KwaZulu-Natal Province: Lionel Mtshali 
 Limpopo Province: Ngoako Ramathlodi
 Mpumalanga Province: Ndaweni Mahlangu
 North West Province: Popo Molefe 
 Northern Cape Province: Manne Dipico
 Western Cape Province: 
 until 3 June: Peter Marais
 3 June-21 June: Piet Meyer
 since 21 June: Marthinus van Schalkwyk

Events

January
 29 – Doctors Without Borders, an international humanitarian organisation, begins importing a cheap generic version of patented AIDS drugs into South Africa in defiance of South Africa's patent laws.

March
 27 – Health Minister Manto Tshabalala-Msimang approaches the Constitutional Court to stop the issuing of Nevirapine.
 Sivan Pillay, Ed Jordan, Nkhensani Mangani and Karl Anderson are appointed as the first judges of reality show Coca-Cola Popstars, which yields two new pop groups, winners 101 and runners-up Afro Z.

April
 25 – Mark Shuttleworth becomes the second self-funded spaceflight participant.
 26 – A South African Air Force Impala Mk I jet crashes near the Albasini Dam between Louis Trichardt and Musina, killing pilot Captain Brett Burmeister.

May
 20 – Health Minister Manto Tshabalala-Msimang announces at the World Health Assembly in Geneva that South Africa pledges R20 million to the Global Fund to Fight HIV/AIDS, tuberculosis and malaria.

June
 16 – The Hector Pieterson Museum becomes the first museum to open in Soweto.
 27 – Two South African Air Force Oryx helicopters, flying from the South African Antarctic research ship Agulhas, takes emergency food supplies and evacuates 21 Russian scientists from the German-owned Magdalena Oldendorff which has been trapped in ice off Antarctica since 16 June.

July
 15 – Nelson Mandela calls on government and business leaders worldwide to find ways to provide access to treatment to people living with HIV/AIDS.

August
 8 – The government announces the approval of an anti-retroviral roll-out plan.
 9 – Ed Fagan leads a $50bn class action suit by a few apartheid-era victims against international firms and banks who profited from dealings with the apartheid government.
 25 – The Medicines Control Council threatens to de-register Nevirapine unless further studies and appropriate documentation can show its efficacy in the prevention of mother-to-child transmission of HIV.

September
 15 – Johan Pretorius, Boeremag member, is arrested and charged when he is found with a truckload of weapons and explosives in Lichtenburg.
 20 – Boeremag members Dirk Hanekom and Henk van Zyl are arrested in Memel, Free State, but only Hanekom is charged.
 22 – A South African Air Force Museum T-6G Harvard crashes into power lines during a flypast at Africa Aerospace and Defence 2002, being held at AFB Waterkloof, Pretoria. Pilot Colonel Jeff Earle escapes with minor injuries.

October
 10 – President of South Africa Thabo Mbeki states that AIDS drugs are dangerously toxic to people and questions whether HIV or poverty is the true cause of Aids.
 30 – Nine bombs explode in Soweto and one in Bronkhorstspruit. The Boeremag claims responsibility.

November
 4 – Alleged Boeremag leader Tom Vorster is arrested in Pretoria for the October bombings.
 22 – A bomb explodes at the Grand Central Airport in Midrand, Gauteng.
 28 – A bomb explodes on a bridge on the border between KwaZulu-Natal and the Eastern Cape Provinces.

December
 16–20 – The African National Congress holds its 51st National Conference in Stellenbosch.

Unknown date
 Mbongeni Ngema's controversial song "AmaNdiya" is banned.

Deaths
 26 April – Steve Tshwete, activist and politician. (b. 1938)
 15 May – Nellie Shabalala, musician. (b. 1953)
 1 June – Hansie Cronje, cricketer. (b. 1969)
 29 June – Stephen Fry, Springbok captain. (b. 1924)

See also
2002 in South African television

References

South Africa
Years in South Africa
History of South Africa
Years of the 21st century in South Africa
2000s in South Africa